Thysanostemon is a genus of flowering plants belonging to the family Clusiaceae.

Its native range is Guyana.

Species:
 Thysanostemon fanshawei Maguire 
 Thysanostemon pakaraimae Maguire

References

Clusiaceae
Malpighiales genera